Lieutenant General James Arthur Fox,  is a retired Canadian military officer who served as Commander, Mobile Command of the Canadian Forces from 1986 to 1989.

Military career
Fox joined the Royal Canadian Armoured Corps and went on to be commanding officer of Lord Strathcona's Horse, taking his regiment on an operational tour with the United Nations Peacekeeping Force in Cyprus in 1972.

Fox was appointed Commander, Mobile Command in 1986. In that role he executed Rendezvous 89, a major exercise involving 15,000 military personnel and more than 5,000 vehicles and aircraft from 40 different units across Canada.

In retirement he became colonel of Lord Strathcona's Horse.

References

Living people
Canadian generals
Lord Strathcona's Horse officers
Commanders of the Order of Military Merit (Canada)
Year of birth missing (living people)
Commanders of the Canadian Army